Joseph Breitbach (1903–1980) was a French-German playwright, novelist and journalist. He was born in Koblenz and died in Munich. He is best known for his novel Bericht über Bruno (Report on Bruno).

The Joseph-Breitbach-Preis is named after him.

References

External links
 

German male writers
1903 births
1980 deaths
Knights Commander of the Order of Merit of the Federal Republic of Germany
Members of the German Academy for Language and Literature